Sadeq Abdul Kareem Malallah (born in Qateef in 1970; died September 2, 1992) was a Shiite Saudi Arabian who was beheaded in Qateef on 3 September 1992 for allegedly “insulting Muhammad and Islam's holy book, the Koran”. He was accused of allegedly calling Muhammad "a liar and swindler" who used  "witchcraft" and got "help from devils," and of saying “the Koran was fabricated by Muhammad” and Islam is "a fabricated religion". He had been convicted by kangaroo court of allegedly “throwing stones at a police car” in 1988 and was serving a five year sentence in Mabahith prison at the time. Later, a judge in Qatif "accused him of smuggling a Bible into the country" and asked him to convert to Wahhabi Islam, the puritanic sect prevailing in Saudi Arabia, which harbors deep suspicions about Shiite Muslims. When Malallah refused, he reportedly was placed in solitary and physically abused. He maintained his innocence of any wrongdoings until the last moment.

External links

1970 births
1992 deaths
20th-century executions by Saudi Arabia
Executed Saudi Arabian people
People executed by Saudi Arabia by decapitation
Saudi Arabian Shia Muslims
Violence against Shia Muslims in Saudi Arabia
People executed for apostasy from Islam